St Anthony of Padua (1195–1231) was a Franciscan friar and Doctor of the Church.

St Anthony of Padua may also refer to:

 St Anthony of Padua, Oxford, a church in Oxford, England
 Church of St. Anthony of Padua, Kokshetau, a church in Kokshetau, Kazakhstan
 St. Anthony's Church (Bronx), a church in The Bronx, New York City, U.S.
 St. Anthony of Padua Church (Bronx), a church in The Bronx, New York City, U.S.
 St. Anthony of Padua Church (Manhattan), a church in Manhattan, New York City, U.S.

See also 
 St. Anthony of Padua Church (disambiguation)
 St. Anthony's Church (disambiguation)